The 18th Infantry Regiment ("Vanguards") is an Army Infantry regiment.  The 18th Infantry Regiment currently exists with one active battalion under the U.S. Army Regimental System and has no regimental headquarters.

 1st Battalion, 18th Infantry Regiment's home duty station is located at Fort Riley, Kansas with the 2d "Dagger" Brigade Combat Team, 1st Infantry Division.  It is a combined arms battalion.
 2nd Battalion, 18th Infantry Regiment was stationed in Baumholder, Germany as part of the 170th infantry Brigade Combat Team (Separate) and inactivated with the brigade in 2012.
 3rd Battalion, 18th Infantry Regiment was stationed in Lawrence, Massachusetts as part of the 187th Infantry Brigade, 94th Army Reserve Command (1963–1994).
 4th Battalion, 18th Infantry was part of the Berlin Brigade stationed in West Berlin in the 1960s along with the 2nd and 3rd Battalions, 6th Infantry. West Berlin was 100 miles behind the Iron Curtain in East Germany surrounded by an estimated force of 270,000 Russian and East German troops. The battalion was later reflagged as the 4th Battalion, 6th Infantry.

History

Civil War 
 Established with other US Regular Army Regiments in the Regular Brigade at Camp Thomas, Ohio July 1861.  Participated in the Western Campaigns of the War as a part of the US XIV Army Corps Under MG George Thomas, MG John M. Palmer and MG Jefferson C. Davis.

Perryville, KY; Stones River, TN; Chickamauga, GA; Chattanooga, TN; Campaign for Atlanta.

Utoy Creek GA 5 August 1864 as part of Johnsons 1st Division, XIV Army Corps under MG John M Palmer the Regular Brigade was cited for making a crossing of North Utoy Creek under fire assaulting and driving Armstrong's Confederate Cavalry Brigade Dismounted from their position at Peyton Road. 15th and 18th US Infantry were cited for this action in the Official Records.  The Battalion and Regular Brigade and participated in the initial attack 5 August 1864 south of Atlanta at the battle of Utoy Creek, GA in an attempt to break the main siege lines in Atlanta protecting the Railroads at East Point, GA.  Conducted a feint assault 6 August 1864 to support XXIII Corps Attack at Utoy Creek and participated in the three-week Siege of Atlanta along high ground east of Utoy Creek in SW Atlanta near Willis Mill and Adams Park, GA (Near Current Fort McPherson, GA).

Indian Wars
 Fetterman Massacre. On 21 December 1866, CPT William J. Fetterman took command of a composite force consisting of the former battalion quartermaster, Captain Frederick Brown, 2nd Lt. George Grummond, 49 enlisted troops of the 18th Infantry, 27 men of the 2nd Cavalry Regiment, and 2 civilian scouts.  Ignoring his orders not to venture beyond Lodge Trail Ridge (out of sight and support distance from the fort), Fetterman pursued a small band of Sioux and was lured into an ambush. He found himself facing approximately 2,000 Indians. Within 20 minutes, Fetterman and his command had been wiped out.

World War II
 North African campaign. On 8 November 1942, the 18th Infantry Regiment (part of the 1st Infantry Division) went ashore at Oran, Algeria. Ensuring that the 18th was one of the first U.S. Army infantry units to engage in combat against Axis forces. The regiment (or elements of the regiment) would experience heavy action over the following seven months at Maktar, Tebourba, Medjez el Bab, the Battle of Kasserine Pass (where American forces were pushed back), and Gafsa. It also participated at El Guettar, Béja, and Mateur. The 18th Infantry Regiment was in combat in the Tunisian Campaign from 21 January 1943 to 9 May 1943, helping secure Tunisia for the Allies.
 Invasion of Sicily.  The regiment participated in The Battle of Gela (10 - 12 May 1943) where it withstood heavy counterattacks from Italian and German forces. On 7 August 1943, the 18th Infantry Regiment captured Mount Pellegrino which overlooked the Troina defenses allowing accurate direction of Allied artillery.
 Invasion of Normandy. The 18th Infantry Regiment was part of the landing forces that participated in the initial onset of Operation Overlord. The 18th Regimental Combat Team (RCT) was part of the 1st Infantry Division forces that stormed Omaha Beach. The regiment was scheduled to land at 09:30 on Easy Red. The first battalion to land, 2/18, arrived at the E-1 draw 30 minutes late after a difficult passage through the congestion off shore. Casualties were light, though despite the existence of a narrow channel through the beach obstacles the ramps and mines there accounted for the loss 22 LCVP's, 2 LCI(L)'s and 4 LCT's. Supported by tank and subsequent naval fire, the newly arrived troops took the surrender of the last strong point defending the entrance to the E-1 draw at 11:30. Although a usable exit was finally opened, congestion prevented an early exploitation inland. The three battalions of the 115th RCT, scheduled to land from 10:30 on Dog Red and Easy Green came in together and on top of the 18th RCT landings at Easy Red. The confusion prevented the remaining two battalions of the 18th RCT from landing until 13:00 and delayed the move off the beach of all but 2/18, which had exited the beach further east before noon, until 14:00. Even then, this movement was hampered by mines and enemy positions still in action further up the draw.

Northwest Europe The 18th Infantry Regiment would experience almost eleven months of continual combat operations from the allied invasion of Normandy (June 6, 1944) to the end of World War II in Europe in May 1945. Among the many actions that the regiment participated in were Battle of Aachen, Battle of Hürtgen Forest, The Battle of the Bulge and crossing at the Remagen bridgehead 15–16 March 1945.

Operation Desert Shield/Operation Desert Storm
  The 1st BN 18th Inf was assigned to the 197th Inf Bde Sep in Jul 1990 at Ft Benning Ga. 
 In September 1990, the 197th Infantry Brigade (M)(S) deployed from Fort Benning Georgia to Saudi Arabia, attached to the 24th Infantry Division in defense of the Arabian kingdom during Operation Desert Shield.  The combat units of the 197th included 1st Bn 18th Inf Regt (1/18), 2nd Bn 18th Inf Regt (2/18), 4/41 Field Artillery and 2/69 Armor.
 During Operation Desert Storm, the 24th ID was the right flank of the XVIII Airborne Corps' push into Iraq.  As the division pushed north, elements of the 197th engaged the enemy in Basra during the offensive, to include soldiers from 1/18.
 Upon returning from ODS/S, the 197th Infantry Brigade transitioned to become the 3rd Brigade of the 24th Infantry Division.  Soldiers who deployed to ODS/S, as a result of the attachment to the 24th ID, are authorized to wear the combat patch for either the 197th Infantry Brigade or the 24th ID.
December 1990, Elements of 5/18, and 4/18 Brigade deployed from NATO in Europe to Kingdom of Saudi Arabia for Operations Desert Shield, engaging into Iraq and Kuwait for Desert Storm and Provide Comfort.  Units were inactivated shortly after Jun 1991.

Global War on Terror
 Operation Iraqi Freedom II.  In January 2004 the 1st Battalion, 18th Infantry Regiment deployed as part of the 2nd "Dagger" Brigade Combat Team, 1st Infantry Division from their home station in Schweinfurt, Germany for OIF II.  1–18 Infantry redeployed to Schweinfurt, Germany in February 2005.
 The battalion commander, then-Lieutenant Colonel Jeffrey Sinclair was quoted in The Age (Melbourne, Australia) regarding use of money to fight the Iraqi insurgency:

Lieutenant-Colonel, commander of the 1st Battalion, 18th Infantry Regiment in Tikrit, paid $US500 to a driver to get his car repaired; paid "benevolent" money to the family of a victim of violence; paid people to clean streets; bought soccer kits for a team and repaired a swimming pool. Other officers have given money to ice-cream vendors, chicken farmers and hardware suppliers to get their businesses going. "I'm trying to give them something to do rather than take shots at someone," said Colonel Sinclair, who said he gets $US50,000 every three or four weeks to distribute. "It's not bribery. It's priming the pump. And it works well." The cash incentive scheme comes as some top officers are questioning whether the practice of keeping their troops highly visible in Iraq is doing more harm than good.

 Operation Iraqi Freedom 06-08.  On 1 September 2006 the 1st Battalion, 18th Infantry Regiment deployed as part of the 2nd "Dagger" Brigade Combat Team, 1st Infantry Division from their home station in Schweinfurt, Germany for OIF 06-08.  The battalion was task organized, sending Company B to Ramadi, Iraq with Task Force 1–77 AR and in return receiving Company A, 1–77 Armor, a Fire Support Team from 1–7 Field Artillery, a platoon of combat engineers from 9th Engineer Battalion, and a Maintenance Support Team for 299th Forward Support Battalion.  Task Force 1–18 Infantry moved north into Iraq on 19 October 2006 and occupied FOB Falcon, Baghdad.  The battalion task force conducted combat operation in the Al Rasheed district of southwest Baghdad until 21 November 2007, when it redeployed back to Schweinfurt, Germany.
 Operation Iraqi Freedom 2008–2009 1st Battalion was sent to Baghdad in support of combat operations. There they helped the Iraqi Army through elections and policing actions. Headquartered at Camp Justice with several "FOBs" in the north western part of the city.
 Operation Enduring Freedom 08-09. In 2008 the 2nd Battalion, 18th Infantry Regiment was part of Combined Joint Force Task 101 in Afghanistan. They operated in Khost, Kunar, Kandahar and Kabul provinces for most of their times in the Chapa Dara and Chahar Dara district before the large offensive.
 Operation New Dawn, Iraq, 2010-2011. 1st Battalion, 18th Infantry deployed in NOV 2010 to NOV 2011 as part of the Dagger Brigade (2/1ID). The battalion's mission was to partner with the 9th and 11th Iraqi Army Divisions to increase their operational capabilities. The efforts of the battalion and its Military Transition Teams were instrumental in the continued development of those forces and their ability to provide security for Iraq.  On June 6, the sniper section, attached to 1-7FA at Camp Loyalty, attempted to engage insurgents who launched an IRAM (improvised, rocket-assisted, munition) attack that killed several Soldiers and friends. Barbaric operated at OLD MOD, Chaos operated at FOB Hammer, Dog operated at Rustimiyah until late January 2011 when it rejoined Apocalypse, Phantom, and HHC at Camp Taji, Iraq. Barbaric led the movement of the battalion's motorized equipment to Kuwait during the retrograde operations from Iraq to Kuwait in October 2011. The Vanguards redeployed to Fort Riley, KS in November, 2011 and began preparations for its next mission.
 Operation Enduring Freedom, Horn of Africa, 2013-14. 1–18 IN deployed to the Horn of Africa in December 2013 as part of Operation Enduring Freedom – HOA.  The battalion secured key facilities, trained partner nation military forces throughout East Africa and manned the East African Response Force (EARF).  Almost immediately upon arrival in theater, the Department of State requested security support in Juba, South Sudan.  The EARF deployed to Juba and helped secure the Embassy from December 2013 to April 2014.  During this mission, the battalion helped evacuate over 700 US and several other nations' citizens.

Victory Day

On 9 May 2010, a detachment led by Captain Matthew Strand from the 2nd Battalion, 18th Infantry Regiment represented the United States in Russia's Victory Day parade across Red Square and the request of Russian Minister of Defence Anatoly Serdyukov in a letter to U.S. Secretary of Defense Robert Gates. They were joined by British, French, and Polish troops as well as detachments from the CIS member states. Labeled by Russian President Dmitry Medvedev as the "Anti-Hitler Coalition," it marked the first time in history that American and NATO troops joined the Russian Military in the 9 May parade. A member of the contingent from Kemah, Texas, Russian-born 1st Lieutenant Ilya Ivanov, is a descendant of Major Alexander Peteryaev, a platoon leader in the Soviet Red Army. The Head of the Military University of the Russian Ministry of Defense, Colonel General Valery Marchenkov later awarded to soldiers for their participation in the parade.

Lineage

 Constituted 3 May 1861, in the Regular Army as the 1st Battalion, 18th Infantry Regiment.
 Organized 22 July 1861, at Camp Thomas, Ohio
 Reorganized and redesignated 21 September 1866, as the 18th Infantry
 Consolidated in April 1869 with the 25th Infantry (see ANNEX) and consolidated unit designated as the 18th Infantry
 Assigned 8 June 1917, to the 1st Expeditionary Division (later redesignated as the 1st Infantry Division)
 Relieved 15 February 1957, from assignment to the 1st Infantry Division and reorganized as a parent regiment under the Combat Arms Regimental System
 Withdrawn 16 June 1989, from the Combat Arms Regimental System and reorganized under the United States Army Regimental System

ANNEX

 Constituted 3 May 1861, in the Regular Army as the 2d Battalion, 16th Infantry Regiment.
 Organized 12 May 1862, at Camp Thomas, Ohio

Assigned to the 1st Division XIV Army Corps under Major General George H. Thomas, Participated at the Battle of Chickamauga, GA as part of the Third (Regular) Brigade and was instrumental in preventing the destruction of the Union Army under Major General William Rosecrans at Chickamauga, GA Sep 1863. Participated in the operations at Chattanooga, GA and the following Atlanta Campaign assigned to the Third Brigade. Served under Brig. General John H. King and Brig. Gen. Absalom Baird's First Division and MG John M Palmer until the Attack at Utoy Creek.  The 18th US Infantry distinguished itself in its performance, along with the 15th US Infantry, in a combat water crossing at North Utoy Creek, securing the position for the 1st Division under Brigadier General Johnston 3 Aug 1864 and participated in the preliminary and main attacks on 6 August 1864.  Involved in cutting the rail lines south of Atlanta at Rough and Ready Station (Forest Park GA 30 Aug 1864). After the Capture of Atlanta, the regiment and the rest of the Army of the Cumberland moved back in pursuit of Hood's Confederate Army into Tennessee. Involved in the Battle of Nashville and the destruction of the Confederate Army of Tennessee on 15–16 December 1864. The unit crest shows the symbol of the XIV Corps, the Acorn, adopted by Gen. George H. Thomas, "The Rock of Chickamauga."

 Reorganized and redesignated 21 September 1866, as the 25th Infantry
 Consolidated in April 1869 with the 18th Infantry and consolidated unit designated as the 18th Infantry

On 17 March 2008, 1–18 Infantry was inactivated in Schweinfurt, Germany, to be relocated to Fort Riley, Kansas. On 28 March, the 18th Infantry Regimental colors were un-cased at Fort Riley, and the unit that was the 1st Battalion, 41st Infantry Regiment re-flagged to 1–18 Infantry (Combined Arms Battalion). The 28 March re-flagging at Fort Riley was part of the 3rd Heavy Brigade Combat Team, 1st Armored Division's re-flagging to the 2nd Heavy Brigade Combat Team, 1st Infantry Division, bringing all 1st Infantry Division brigades but 3rd BCT, 1 ID to Fort Riley.

On 15 July 2009, 2–18 Infantry stood up in Baumholder, Germany as part of the 170th Infantry Brigade Combat Team.  The unit was stood up to replace 1–6 Infantry (Regulars), part 2nd Brigade of the 1st Armored Division.

Campaign participation credit

Decorations

 Presidential Unit Citation (Army) for BEJA, TUNISIA
 Presidential Unit Citation (Army) for NORMANDY
 Presidential Unit Citation (Army) for AACHEN, GERMANY
 Valorous Unit Award for BINH LONG PROVINCE
 Valorous Unit Award for DI AN DISTRICT
 Valorous Unit Award for IRAQ
 Valorous Unit Award for IRAQ-KUWAIT
 Valorous Unit Award for the 1st Battalion (minus Company B) for Operation Iraqi Freedom VI-VIII, 12 October 2006 – 17 November 2007
 Valorous Unit Award for Bravo Company, 1st Battalion, 18th Infantry Regiment, Operation Iraqi Freedom VI-VIII, Al Ramadi, Al Anbar Province, 10 Feb 2007 – 17 Mar 2007
 Navy Unit Commendation for Company B, 1st Battalion for Operation Iraqi Freedom VI-VIII, October 2006 – November 2007
 Meritorious Unit Commendation for OPERATION NEW DAWN (IRAQ)
 Army Superior Unit Award for 1994
 Army Superior Unit Award for 1996–1997
 Army Superior Unit Award for 1998–1999
 French Croix de Guerre with Palm, World War I for AISNE-MARNE
 French Croix de Guerre with Palm, World War I for MEUSE-ARGONNE
 French Croix de Guerre with Palm, World War II for KASSERINE
 French Croix de Guerre with Palm, World War II for NORMANDY
 French Médaille militaire, Fourragere
 Belgian Fourragere 1940
 Cited in the Order of the Day of the Belgian Army for action at Mons
 Cited in the Order of the Day of the Belgian Army for action at Eupen-Malmedy

Commanders
Source of commanders: 18th Infantry Regiment Association
Names marked by an @ indicate actual commanders in the absence of the colonel; an asterisk (*) = Commanders of the 18th Battle Group; 1–18 = 1st Battalion, 18th Infantry; 2–18 = 2d Battalion, 18th Infantry; and so forth.  (1) following a name indicates future commander of 1st Infantry Division

Medal of Honor recipients 

 First Lieutenant Henry B. Freeman.  Civil War.  On 31 December 1862, while assigned to the 1st Battalion, 18th Infantry Regiment at the Battle of Stone River, Tennessee, 1LT Freeman voluntarily went to the front and picked up and carried to a place of safety, under a heavy fire from the enemy, an acting field officer who had been wounded, and was about to fall into enemy hands.
 First Lieutenant Frederick Phisterer.  Civil War.  On 31 December 1862, while assigned to the 2d Battalion, 18th Infantry Regiment at the Battle of Stone River, Tennessee, 1LT Phisterer voluntarily conveyed, under a heavy fire, information to the commander of a battalion of regular troops by which the battalion was saved from capture or annihilation.
 Sergeant George Grant.  Indian Wars.  Assigned to Company E, 18th U.S. Infantry Regiment.  At Fort Phil Kearny to Fort C. F. Smith, Dakota Territory, February 1867. Citation: Bravery, energy, and perseverance, involving much suffering and privation through attacks by hostile Indians, deep snows, etc., while voluntarily carrying dispatches.  Date of issue: 6 May 1871.
 Private Carlton W. Barrett.  World War II.  On 6 June 1944, during the D-Day invasion near St. Laurent-sur-Mer, France, PVT Barrett, landing in the face of extremely heavy enemy fire, was forced to wade ashore through neck-deep water. Disregarding the personal danger, he returned to the surf again and again to assist his floundering comrades and save them from drowning. Refusing to remain pinned down by the intense barrage of small-arms and mortar fire poured at the landing points, Pvt. Barrett, working with fierce determination, saved many lives by carrying casualties to an evacuation boat Iying offshore. In addition to his assigned mission as guide, he carried dispatches the length of the fire-swept beach; he assisted the wounded; he calmed the shocked; he arose as a leader in the stress of the occasion.
 Staff Sergeant Walter D. Ehlers.  World War II.  On 9 June 1944, near Goville, France, he led his unit's attack against German forces and single-handedly defeated several enemy machinegun nests. The next day, his platoon came under heavy fire and he covered their withdrawal, carried a wounded rifleman to safety, and continued to lead despite his own wounds. For his actions, he was issued the Medal of Honor six months later, on 19 December 1944.
 Staff Sergeant Arthur F. DeFranzo.  World War II.  On 10 June 1944, while serving with the 18th Infantry Regiment near Vaubadon, France, he was wounded while rescuing an injured man from hostile fire. Despite his own injuries, he led an attack on the enemy positions and continued to advance and encourage his men even after being hit several more times. He destroyed an enemy machine gun position just before succumbing to his wounds. For these actions, he was posthumously awarded the Medal of Honor seven months later, on 4 January 1945.
 Private First Class Gino J. Merli.  World War II.  On the evening of 4 September 1944, near Sars la Bruyere, Belgium, his company was attacked by a superior German force. Their position was overwhelmed, but PFC Merli stayed with his machine gun covering their retreat. When his position was overrun, he feigned death while German soldiers prodded him with their bayonets, only to rise and confront the enemy when they withdrew. Twice he fooled German soldiers into believing he was no longer a threat, only to attack them again when they left him for dead. In the morning, a counterattack forced the Germans to ask for a truce. The negotiating party found Merli still at his gun.
 Staff Sergeant Joseph E. Schaefer.  World War II.  On 24 September 1944, near Stolberg, Germany, SSG Schaefer led his squad in their defense against a German attack. He voluntarily took the most dangerous defensive position, killed many of the attacking soldiers, and single-handedly captured ten. He then participated in the American counter-attack and freed a group of American soldiers captured earlier. For his actions during the battle, he was awarded the Medal of Honor eleven months later, on 22 August 1945.
 Captain Robert "Bobbie" Evan Brown Jr.  World War II.  On 8 October 1944, at Crucifix Hill, Aachen, Germany, while serving with Company C, 18th Infantry Regiment, while under continuous artillery mortar, automatic, and small-arms fire, CPT Brown single-handedly knocked out three enemy bunkers.  Wounded, but refusing medical treatment he went out alone to reconnoiter other enemy positions.  He sustained two more wounds but was successful in relaying the information of the enemy positions which lead to their destruction.
 Sergeant Max Thompson.  World War II.  On 18 October 1944, while assigned to Company K, 18th Infantry Regiment near Haaren, Germany, he single-handedly attacked the German forces on several occasions. For his actions, he was awarded the Medal of Honor eight months later, on 18 June 1945.
 Staff Sergeant George Peterson..  World War II.  On 30 March 1945, while assigned to Company K, 18th Infantry Regiment near Eisern, Germany, Peterson was severely wounded but continued in the fight and single-handedly destroyed three German machinegun nests before receiving another, fatal, wound. He was posthumously awarded the Medal of Honor seven months later, on 17 October 1945.
 First Lieutenant Walter J. Will.  World War II.  On 30 March 1945, while assigned to Company K, 18th Infantry Regiment near Eisern, Germany, 1LT Will rescued three wounded men, single-handedly disabled two German machinegun nests and led his squad in the capture of two others, all despite his own injuries. Mortally wounded while leading a charge on the enemy, Will was posthumously awarded the Medal of Honor seven months later, on 17 October 1945.

See also
List of United States Regular Army Civil War units

References

External links

 Summary of 18th Regiment of Infantry 1861–1890
 

0018
018th Infantry Regiment
018th Infantry Regiment
Military units and formations of the United States in the Indian Wars
United States Regular Army Civil War units and formations
Military units and formations of the United States Army in the Vietnam War
Infantry regiments of the United States Army in World War II
Military units and formations of the United States in the Gulf War
United States Army regiments of World War I
1861 establishments in Ohio
Military units and formations established in 1861